was a Japanese jazz fusion band formed in 1975.

History 
Prism was formed in 1975 by Akira Wada, Ken Watanabe, Katsutoshi Morizono, Daisaku Kume, Koki "Corky" Ito and Toru "Rika" Suzuki. Most of the musicians had little professional experience, aside from Morizono, who founded the progressive rock band Yonin Bayashi (ja). In 1976, the group were signed to Polydor Records, performed as an opening act for Eric Clapton, and toured nationwide. Prism released their debut album in 1977, Prism, which ran out of stock after its release. Their 1986 song 'Take Off' was featured in a Mild Seven commercial.

Members 
As of August 2019, Prism is composed of Jiro Okada (bass), Satoshi "Mansaku" Kimura (drums), Akira Wada (guitar) and Tatsuya "Cheru" Watanabe (keyboards, vocals). On March 28, 2021, Wada died at the age of 64.

Discography 
Prism have released a total of 28 albums since 1977. The band was signed to Universal Music Group in 2003, which re-released the band's first four albums, and remained their record publisher.

 Prism (1977)
 Second Thought/Second Move (1978)
 Prism III (1979)
 Prism Live (1979)
 Surprise (1980)
 Community Illusion (1981)
 Live Alive (Absolutely) (1981)
 Visions (1982)
 Nothin' Unusual (1985)
 Dreamin (1986)
 Live Alive Vol. 2 (1987)
 The Silence of the Motion (1987)
 Mother Earth (1990)
 Rejuvenation (1991)
 A Personal Change (1992)
 Prism Jam (1995)
 Uncovered (1995)
 Prismania (1997)
 Whiter (1997)
 In the Last Resort (2001)
 Present I (2003)
 Present II (2003)
 【Mju:】 (2003)
 1977 Live at Sugino Kodo (2004)
 Homecoming 2004 (2004)
 Blue... (2007)
 Prism 30th Anniversary Live! [Homecoming] (2007)
 Prism Homecoming Vol. 3 (2008)
 Invite (2009)
 Palace in the Sky (2011)
 Mode:Odd (2013)
 Celebrate (2017)
 What You See (2017)

References

External links 
 

Japanese jazz ensembles
Jazz fusion ensembles
Jazz-rock groups
Universal Music Japan artists